Taltheilei Narrows Airport  is a private aerodrome in the Northwest Territories that is only open in the summer months. Prior permission is required to land except in the case of an emergency.

See also
 Taltheilei Narrows Water Aerodrome

References

Registered aerodromes in the North Slave Region